ACFAS may refer to:
American College of Foot and Ankle Surgeons, Professional medical society
Association francophone pour le savoir, French-Canadian learned society